Rattlesnake Point may refer to:

 Rattlesnake Point (Canada), a conservation area in Milton, Ontario, Canada
 Rattlesnake Point (United States), a mountain summit in Texas, United States